Ramón Ayala is an accordion player from Hidalgo, Texas, who currently resides in the Rio Grande Valley. He is the son of Pedro Ayala. His progressive style and technique has earned him the 2009 Accordion Player of the Year Award from the South Texas Conjunto Association. In 2009 he celebrated his 45th career anniversary.

Career
Ramón Ayala started playing the accordion in 1951. He learned to play the drums in 1954. In 1955, he picked up the bajo sexto after his father Pedro Ayala, El Monarca del Acordeón, showed him his first two chords. By 1956,  Ramón Ayala and his brother Pedro Ayala Jr., who played the accordion, joined their father in Pedro Ayala y Su Conjunto. Since 1956, Ramón Ayala has gone on to record for over a dozen studios releasing 88 recordings in album, single, cassette and CD formats. Ramón Ayala has recorded with Freddy Fender, Paulino Bernal and Esteban Jordan, among others. To date, he has released 105 recordings.

References

External links
 The Arhoolie Foundation 1
 The Arhoolie Foundation 2
 The Arhoolie Foundation 3

1928 births
Latin Grammy Award winners
People from Hidalgo County, Texas
Bajo sexto and bajo quinto players
Living people
American male songwriters
Songwriters from Texas
Latin music songwriters
20th-century accordionists
20th-century American musicians
20th-century American male musicians
21st-century accordionists
21st-century American musicians
21st-century American male musicians